The gospels of Matthew, Mark, and Luke are referred to as the synoptic Gospels because they include many of the same stories, often in a similar sequence and in similar or sometimes identical wording. They stand in contrast to John, whose content is largely distinct. The term synoptic comes via Latin from the Greek , synopsis, i.e. "(a) seeing all together, synopsis"; the sense of the word in English, the one specifically applied to these three gospels, of "giving an account of the events from the same point of view or under the same general aspect" is a modern one.

This strong parallelism among the three gospels in content, arrangement, and specific language is widely attributed to literary interdependence. The question of the precise nature of their literary relationship—the synoptic problem—has been a topic of debate for centuries and has been described as "the most fascinating literary enigma of all time". While no conclusive solution has been found yet, the longstanding majority view favors Marcan priority, in which both Matthew and Luke have made direct use of the Gospel of Mark as a source, and further holds that Matthew and Luke also drew from an additional hypothetical document, called Q.

Structure

Common features 

Broadly speaking, the synoptic gospels are similar to John: all are composed in Koine Greek, have a similar length, and were completed within a century of Jesus' death. They also differ from non-canonical sources, such as the Gospel of Thomas, in that they belong to the ancient genre of biography, collecting not only Jesus' teachings, but recounting in an orderly way his origins, his ministry and miracles, and his passion and resurrection.

In content and in wording, though, the synoptics diverge widely from John but have a great deal in common with each other. Though each gospel includes some unique material, the majority of Mark and roughly half of Matthew and Luke coincide in content, in much the same sequence, often nearly verbatim. This common material is termed the triple tradition.

The triple tradition 

The triple tradition, the material included by all three synoptic gospels, includes many stories and teachings:

The triple tradition's pericopae (passages) tend to be arranged in much the same order in all three gospels. This stands in contrast to the material found in only two of the gospels, which is much more variable in order.

The classification of text as belonging to the triple tradition (or for that matter, double tradition) is not always definitive, depending rather on the degree of similarity demanded. Matthew and Mark report the cursing of the fig tree, a single incident, despite some substantial differences of wording and content. In Luke, the only parable of the barren fig tree, is in a different point of the narrative. Some would say that Luke has extensively adapted an element of the triple tradition, while others would regard it as a distinct pericope.

Example 

An illustrative example of the three texts in parallel is the healing of the leper:

More than half the wording in this passage is identical. Each gospel includes words absent in the other two and omits something included by the other two.

Relation to Mark 

The triple tradition itself constitutes a complete gospel quite similar to the shortest gospel, Mark.

Mark, unlike Matthew and Luke, adds little to the triple tradition. Pericopae unique to Mark are scarce, notably two healings involving saliva and the naked runaway. Mark's additions within the triple tradition tend to be explanatory elaborations (e.g., "the stone was rolled back) or Aramaisms (e.g., "Talitha kum!"). The pericopae Mark shares with only Luke are also quite few: the Capernaum exorcism and departure from Capernaum, the strange exorcist, and the widow's mites.

Most scholars take these observations as a strong clue to the literary relationship among the synoptics and Mark's special place in that relationship. The hypothesis favored by most experts is Marcan priority, whereby Mark was composed first, and Matthew and Luke each used Mark,  incorporating much of it, with adaptations, into their own gospels. A leading alternative hypothesis is Marcan posteriority, with Mark having been formed primarily by extracting what Matthew and Luke shared in common.

The double tradition 

 An extensive set of material—some two hundred verses, or roughly half the length of the triple tradition—are the pericopae shared between Matthew and Luke, but absent in Mark. This is termed the double tradition. Parables and other sayings predominate in the double tradition, but also included are narrative elements:

Unlike triple-tradition material, double-tradition material is structured differently in the two gospels. Matthew's lengthy Sermon on the Mount, for example, is paralleled by Luke's shorter Sermon on the Plain, with the remainder of its content scattered throughout Luke. This is consistent with the general pattern of Matthew collecting sayings into large blocks, while Luke does the opposite and intersperses them with narrative.

Besides the double tradition proper, Matthew and Luke often agree against Mark within the triple tradition to varying extents, sometimes including several additional verses, sometimes differing by a single word. These are termed the major and minor agreements (the distinction is imprecise). One example is in the passion narrative, where Mark has simply, "Prophesy!" while Matthew and Luke both add, "Who is it that struck you?"

The double tradition's origin, with its major and minor agreements, is a key facet of the synoptic problem. The simplest hypothesis is Luke relied on Matthew's work or vice versa. But many experts, on various grounds, maintain that neither Matthew nor Luke used the other's work. If this is the case, they must have drawn from some common source, distinct from Mark, that provided the double-tradition material and overlapped with Mark's content where major agreements occur. This hypothetical document is termed Q, for the German Quelle, meaning "source".

Special Matthew and Special Luke 

Matthew and Luke contain a large amount of material found in no other gospel. These materials are sometimes called "Special Matthew" or M and "Special Luke" or L.

Both Special Matthew and Special Luke include distinct opening infancy narratives and post-resurrection conclusions (with Luke continuing the story in his second book Acts). In between, Special Matthew includes mostly parables, while Special Luke includes both parables and healings.

Special Luke is notable for containing a greater concentration of Semitisms than any other gospel material.

Luke gives some indication of how he composed his gospel in his prologue:

Since many have undertaken to set down an orderly account of the events that have been fulfilled among us, just as they were handed on to us by those who from the beginning were eyewitnesses and servants of the word, I too decided, after investigating everything carefully from the very first, to write an orderly account for you, most excellent Theophilus, so that you may know the truth concerning the things about which you have been instructed.

Synoptic problem 

The "synoptic problem" is the question of the specific literary relationship among the three synoptic gospels—that is, the question as to the source or sources upon which each synoptic gospel depended when it was written.

The texts of the three synoptic gospels often agree very closely in wording and order, both in quotations and in narration. Most scholars ascribe this to documentary dependence, direct or indirect, meaning the close agreements among synoptic gospels are due to one gospel's drawing from the text of another, or from some written source that another gospel also drew from.

Controversies 
The synoptic problem hinges on several interrelated points of controversy:
 Priority: Which gospel was written first? (If one text draws from another, the source must have been composed first.)
 Successive dependence: Did each of the synoptic gospels draw from each of its predecessors? (If not, the frequent agreements between the two independent gospels against the third must originate elsewhere.)
 Lost written sources: Did any of the gospels draw from some earlier document which has not been preserved (e.g., the hypothetical "Q", or from earlier editions of other gospels)?
 Oral sources: To what extent did each evangelist or literary collaborator draw from personal knowledge, eyewitness accounts, liturgy, or other oral traditions to produce an original written account?
 Translation: Jesus and others quoted in the gospels spoke primarily in Aramaic, but the gospels themselves in their oldest available form are each written in Koine Greek. Who performed the translations, and at what point?
 Redaction: How and why did those who put the gospels into their final form expand, abridge, alter, or rearrange their sources?

Some theories try to explain the relation of the synoptic gospels to John; to non-canonical gospels such as Thomas, Peter, and Egerton; to the Didache; and to lost documents such as the Hebrew logia mentioned by Papias, the Jewish–Christian gospels, and the Gospel of Marcion.

History 

Ancient sources virtually unanimously ascribe the synoptic gospels to the apostle Matthew, to Peter's interpreter Mark, and to Paul's companion Luke—hence their respective canonical names. The ancient authors, however, did not agree on which order the Gospels had been written. For example, Clement of Alexandria held that Matthew wrote first, Luke wrote second and Mark wrote third; on the other hand, Origen argued that Matthew wrote first, Mark wrote second and Luke wrote third; finally, Tertullian states that John and Matthew were published first and that Mark and Luke came later.

A remark by Augustine of Hippo at the beginning of the fifth century presents the gospels as composed in their canonical order (Matthew, Mark, Luke, John), with each evangelist thoughtfully building upon and supplementing the work of his predecessors—the Augustinian hypothesis (Matthew–Mark).

This view (when any model of dependence was considered at all) seldom came into question until the late eighteenth century, when Johann Jakob Griesbach published in 1776 a synopsis of the synoptic gospels. Instead of harmonizing them, he displayed their texts side by side, making both similarities and divergences apparent. Griesbach, noticing the special place of Mark in the synopsis, hypothesized Marcan posteriority and advanced (as Henry Owen had a few years earlier) the two-gospel hypothesis (Matthew–Luke).

In the nineteenth century, researchers applied the tools of literary criticism to the synoptic problem in earnest, especially in German scholarship. Early work revolved around a hypothetical proto-gospel (Ur-Gospel), possibly in Aramaic, underlying the synoptics. From this line of inquiry, however, a consensus emerged that Mark itself served as the principal source for the other two gospels—Marcan priority.

In a theory first proposed by Christian Hermann Weisse in 1838, the double tradition was explained by Matthew and Luke independently using two sources—thus, the two-source (Mark–Q) theory—which supplemented Mark with another hypothetical source consisting mostly of sayings. This additional source was at first seen as the logia (sayings) spoken of by Papias and thus called "Λ", but later it became more generally known as "Q", from the German Quelle, meaning source. This two-source theory eventually won wide acceptance and was seldom questioned until the late twentieth century; most scholars simply took this new orthodoxy for granted and directed their efforts toward Q itself, and this is  largely the case.

The theory is also well known in a more elaborate form set forth by Burnett Hillman Streeter in 1924, which additionally hypothesized written sources "M" and "L" (for "Special Matthew" and "Special Luke" respectively)—hence the influential four-document hypothesis. This exemplifies the prevailing scholarship of the time,  which saw the canonical gospels as late products, dating from well into the second century, composed by unsophisticated cut-and-paste redactors out of a progression of written sources, and derived in turn from oral traditions and from folklore that had evolved in various communities. More recently, however, as this view has gradually fallen into disfavor, so too has the centrality of documentary interdependence and hypothetical documentary sources as an explanation for all aspects of the synoptic problem.

In recent decades, weaknesses of the two-source theory have been more widely recognized, and debate has reignited. Many have independently argued that Luke did make some use of Matthew after all—the Common Sayings Source. British scholars went further and dispensed with Q entirely, ascribing the double tradition to Luke's direct use of Matthew—the Farrer hypothesis of 1955. New attention is also being given to the Wilke hypothesis of 1838 which, like Farrer, dispenses with Q but ascribes the double tradition to Matthew's direct use of Luke.  Meanwhile, the Augustinian hypothesis has also made a comeback, especially in American scholarship. The Jerusalem school hypothesis has also attracted fresh advocates, as has the Independence hypothesis, which denies documentary relationships altogether.

On this collapse of consensus, Wenham observed: "I found myself in the Synoptic Problem Seminar of the Society for New Testament Studies, whose members were in disagreement over every aspect of the subject. When this international group disbanded in 1982 they had sadly to confess that after twelve years' work they had not reached a common mind on a single issue."

More recently, Andris Abakuks applied a statistical time series approach to the Greek texts to determine the relative likelihood of these proposals. Models without Q fit reasonably well. Matthew and Luke were statistically dependent on their borrowings from Mark. This suggests at least one of Matthew and Luke had access to the other's work. The most likely synoptic gospel to be the last was Luke. The least likely was Mark. While this weighs against the Griesbach proposal and favors the Farrer, he does not claim any proposals are ruled out.

Conclusions 
No definitive solution to the Synoptic Problem has been found yet. The Two-source hypothesis, which was dominant throughout the 20th century, still enjoys the support of most New Testament scholars; however, it has come under substantial attack in recent years by a number of biblical scholars, who have attempted to relaunch the Augustinian hypothesis, the Griesbach hypothesis and the Farrer hypothesis.

In particular, the existence of the Q source has received harsh criticism in the first two decades of the 21st century: scholars such as Mark Goodacre and Brant Pitre have pointed out that no manuscript of Q has ever been found, nor is any reference to Q ever made in the writings of the Church Fathers (or any ancient writings, in fact). This has prompted E. P. Sanders and Margaret Davies to write that the Two-sources hypothesis, while still dominant, "is least satisfactory" and Joseph Fitzmyer to state that the Synoptic Problem is "practically insoluble".

Theories 

Nearly every conceivable theory has been advanced as a solution to the synoptic problem. The most notable theories include:

See also 

 Aramaic primacy
 Authorship of the Gospels
 Biblical criticism
 Gospel harmony
 List of Gospels
 List of key episodes in the Canonical Gospels
 Source criticism

Notes

References

External links 

 Catholic Encyclopedia: Synoptics
 Hypotyposeis: Synoptic Problem Website
 Synoptic Problem: Bibliography of the main studies in English
 TextExcavation: The Synoptic Project
 Synoptic Gospels Primer
 NT Gateway: Synoptic Problem Web Sites
 The Synoptic Problem and its Solution
 Matthew Conflator (Wilke) Hypothesis
 Synoptic Hypotheses and Authors

 
Canonical Gospels
Christian terminology
 
Texts in Koine Greek
Biblical criticism